Perry Hall may refer to:

Perry Hall, Birmingham, whose grounds are now Perry Hall Park
Perry Hall Mansion in Baltimore County, Maryland, named after the above
The district of Perry Hall, Maryland, name after Perry Hall Mansion
Perry Hall High School, Baltimore County, Maryland
Perry Hall (baseball) (1898–1993), American Negro league baseball player
Perry Hall, London, a place in the London Borough of Bromley, United Kingdom

See also
Perry Hill (disambiguation)

Architectural disambiguation pages